Offscreen is a 2006 Danish film directed by Christoffer Boe, who also wrote the screenplay together with Knud Romer Jørgensen. With an odd mixture of fiction and reality, it tells the peculiar story of a man who films himself for a whole year in a quest for invisibility. When he is inevitably caught on camera, however, he takes his own life, causing the movie to take on the fictional aspect of a documentary. When combined with the plight of the homeless, the film can also be a meditation on the difficulties of facing the stranger.

Cast 
 Nicolas Bro -- Nicolas Bro
 Lene Maria Christensen -- Lene Maria Christensen
 Christoffer Boe -- Christoffer Boe
 Lene's Mother -- Karen Margrethe Bjerre
 Lene's Father -- Niels Weyde
 Jakob Cedergren -- Jakob Cedergren
 Assistant Editor -- Bjarke de Koning

Awards 
 2006 Altre Visioni Award at the 63rd Venice International Film Festival for Offscreen
 2006 win at The Nordic Council Film Prize for Offscreen

References

External links 
 
 Official Web Site

2006 films
Danish drama films
2000s Danish-language films
Films directed by Christoffer Boe